Pale Kings and Princes is a Spenser novel by Robert B. Parker. The title is taken from John Keats's poem La Belle Dame sans Merci: A Ballad. Following the murder of a reporter, Spenser is hired by a newspaper to investigate drug smuggling around the area of Wheaton, Massachusetts. There he encounters many troubles, including the death of a policeman and his son. Spenser, with the help of his friend, Hawk, eventually secures the downfall of the local cartel.

An adaptation of the novel was released as a made-for-TV movie in 1994.

References

External links
 Parker's page on the book

1987 American novels
Spenser (novel series)
Novels set in Massachusetts
American novels adapted into films